The 2009 WNBA season is the 11th season for the Connecticut Sun franchise of the Women's National Basketball Association. It is their seventh in Connecticut. The Sun attempted to advance to the WNBA Playoffs for the seventh consecutive season, but did not qualify for the postseason.

Offseason

Dispersal Draft
Based on the Sun's 2008 record, they would pick 10th in the Houston Comets dispersal draft. The Sun waived their pick.

WNBA Draft
The following are the Sun's selections in the 2009 WNBA Draft.

Transactions
July 4: The Sun waived Lauren Ervin due to the arrival of Sandrine Gruda.
June 28: The Sun waived Barbara Turner due to the arrival of Anete Jēkabsone-Žogota.
June 19: The Sun signed Tan White and waived Kristi Cirone.
June 5: The Sun waived Lyndra Littles, Danielle Page and Carrem Gay.
June 3: The Sun claimed Kiesha Brown off waivers.
June 1: The Sun waived Ketia Swanier and Ashley Hayes.
April 20: The Sun signed Carrem Gay to a training camp contract.
April 20: The Sun announced that Tamika Raymond would sit out the 2009 season.
April 13: The Sun announced Jamie Carey's retirement.
April 13: The Sun signed Ashley Hayes to a training camp contract.
April 10: The Sun signed Kristi Cirone to a training camp contract.
February 13: The Sun signed Anete Jēkabsone-Žogota to a training camp contract.
January 23: The Sun signed Lauren Ervin to a rookie-scale contract.
January 21: The Sun signed Barbara Turner, Kerri Gardin, and Danielle Page for the 2009 season.
January 7: The Sun signed Kerri Gardin and Danielle Page to training camp contracts.

Free agents

Additions

Subtractions

Roster

Season standings

Schedule

Preseason

|- align="center" bgcolor="bbffbb"
| 1 || May 22 || 7:00pm || New York || 74-62 || Jones (11) || Black (7) || Whalen (3) || Mohegan Sun Arena  5,578 || 1-0
|- align="center" bgcolor="ffbbbb"
| 2 || May 27 || 7:30pm || @ Atlanta || 73-76 || Phillips (18) || Black, Ervin (6) || Swanier, Whalen (3) || Philips Arena  4,980 || 1-1
|- align="center" bgcolor="ffbbbb"
| 3 || May 31 || 7:00pm || Los Angeles || 77-80 || Phillips (11) || Littles (8) || Phillips, Swanier, Whalen (3) || Mohegan Sun Arena  6,630 || 1-2
|-

Regular season

|- align="center" bgcolor="ffbbbb"
| 1 || June 6 || 4:00pm || Washington ||  || 70-82 || Jones (22) || Whalen (6) || Whalen (4) || Mohegan Sun Arena  7,191 || 0-1
|- align="center" bgcolor="bbffbb"
| 2 || June 7 || 4:00pm || @ New York || WCTX || 66-57 || Whalen (14) || Whalen (12) || Brown, Cirone, Whalen, Whitmore (2) || Madison Square Garden  13,397 || 1-1
|- align="center" bgcolor="ffbbbb"
| 3 || June 14 || 3:00pm || Atlanta ||  || 62-67 || Whalen (16) || Black (9) || Whalen (5) || Mohegan Sun Arena  6,429 || 1-2
|- align="center" bgcolor="ffbbbb"
| 4 || June 16 || 8:00pm || @ Chicago ||  || 75-78 || Jones, Whitmore (16) || Jones (5) || Whalen (8) || UIC Pavilion  2,396 || 1-3
|- align="center" bgcolor="bbffbb"
| 5 || June 19 || 7:00pm || Chicago ||  || 91-61 || Jones (17) || Gardin (11) || Gardin (7) || Mohegan Sun Arena  5,892 || 2-3
|- align="center" bgcolor="bbffbb"
| 6 || June 21 || 3:00pm || San Antonio || NBA TVWCTX || 71-58 || Jones (19) || Black (8) || Jones, Turner, Whalen (3) || Mohegan Sun Arena  6,928 || 3-3
|- align="center" bgcolor="bbffbb"
| 7 || June 27 || 7:00pm || Atlanta ||  || 82-68 || Jones (24) || Jones (12) || Whalen (5) || Mohegan Sun Arena  6,264 || 4-3
|-

|- align="center" bgcolor="ffbbbb"
| 8 || July 2 || 7:00pm || @ Indiana || NBA TVFSI || 53-67 || Whalen (11) || Black (8) || Brown, Whalen, White (3) || Conseco Fieldhouse  6,468 || 4-4
|- align="center" bgcolor="bbffbb"
| 9 || July 5 || 6:00pm || @ Detroit ||  || 95-92 (OT) || Gruda (23) || Gardin, Gruda (6) || Jones (5) || Palace of Auburn Hills  6,981 || 5-4
|- align="center" bgcolor="ffbbbb"
| 10 || July 7 || 7:30pm || @ Atlanta ||  || 67-72 || Jones, White (14) || Gruda, Jones, White (6) || Brown (4) || Philips Arena  6,225 || 5-5
|- align="center" bgcolor="ffbbbb"
| 11 || July 11 || 7:00pm || Detroit || NBA TVWCTX || 77-79 (OT) || Jones (23) || Jones (10) || Whalen (3) || Mohegan Sun Arena  6,342 || 5-6
|- align="center" bgcolor="bbffbb"
| 12 || July 14 || 7:00pm || Los Angeles || ESPN2 || 82-71 || Jones (24) || Gruda (6) || Jones, Whalen (5) || Mohegan Sun Arena  6,612 || 6-6
|- align="center" bgcolor="bbffbb"
| 13 || July 17 || 8:00pm || @ San Antonio ||  || 72-64 || Jones (17) || Gruda, Whalen (7) || Jones, Whalen (5) || AT&T Center  9,524 || 7-6
|- align="center" bgcolor="bbffbb"
| 14 || July 19 || 3:00pm || Indiana ||  || 67-61 || Whalen (15) || Gruda (9) || Whalen (6) || Mohegan Sun Arena  6,517 || 8-6
|- align="center" bgcolor="bbffbb"
| 15 || July 22 || 7:00pm || Sacramento ||  || 83-75 || Jones (28) || Jones (10) || Phillips (7) || Mohegan Sun Arena  5,675 || 9-6
|- align="center" bgcolor="ffbbbb"
| 16 || July 28 || 7:30pm|| Phoenix || ESPN2 || 80-95 || Jekabsone-Zogota (15) || Whalen (8) || Holt, Whalen (4) || Mohegan Sun Arena  7,739 || 9-7
|- align="center" bgcolor="ffbbbb"
| 17 || July 30 || 8:00pm || @ Indiana || FSI || 85-94 (OT) || Jones (21) || Gruda (10) || 5 players (3) || Conseco Fieldhouse  6,538 || 9-8
|-

|- align="center" bgcolor="ffbbbb"
| 18 || August 1 || 7:00pm || @ Chicago || NBA TVWCTX || 72-84 || White (16) || White (6) || Jekabsone-Zogota (6) || UIC Pavilion  3,071 || 9-9
|- align="center" bgcolor="bbffbb"
| 19 || August 2 || 6:00pm || @ Detroit ||  || 83-65 || Whalen (22) || Gruda (8) || Whalen (4) || Palace of Auburn Hills  7,814 || 10-9
|- align="center" bgcolor="ffbbbb"
| 20 || August 7 || 8:00pm || @ Minnesota || NBA TVFSN-N || 88-95 || Gruda (21) || Gruda, Jones (6) || Jekabsone-Zogota (7) || Target Center  8,134 || 10-10
|- align="center" bgcolor="bbffbb"
| 21 || August 9 || 3:00pm || Washington ||  || 96-67 || Whalen (16) || Holt (8) || Whalen (5) || Mohegan Sun Arena  6,528 || 11-10
|- align="center" bgcolor="bbffbb"
| 22 || August 13 || 7:00pm || Seattle ||  || 64-53 || Gruda (14) || Jones (10) || Whalen (7) || Mohegan Sun Arena  6,983 || 12-10
|- align="center" bgcolor="ffbbbb"
| 23 || August 14 || 7:00pm || @ Washington ||  || 89-91 (2OT) || Jones (23) || Gruda (10) || Whalen (5) || Verizon Center  9,738 || 12-11
|- align="center" bgcolor="bbffbb"
| 24 || August 19 || 7:00pm || New York ||  || 74-69 || Whalen (20) || Whalen (10) || White (6) || Mohegan Sun Arena  6,050 || 13-11
|- align="center" bgcolor="ffbbbb"
| 25 || August 21 || 7:30pm || @ New York || NBA TVMSG || 83-85 (OT) || Gruda (24) || Gruda (12) || Whalen (7) || Madison Square Garden  9,355 || 13-12
|- align="center" bgcolor="bbffbb"
| 26 || August 22 || 7:00pm || Minnesota ||  || 98-94 || Gruda, Whalen (21) || Gruda (9) || Whalen (8) || Mohegan Sun Arena  7,803 || 14-12
|- align="center" bgcolor="ffbbbb"
| 27 || August 25 || 7:00pm || Detroit ||  || 70-90 || Gruda (19) || Gardin (7) || Whalen (8) || Mohegan Sun Arena  6,811 || 14-13
|- align="center" bgcolor="ffbbbb"
| 28 || August 27 || 10:00pm || @ Seattle ||  || 74-86 || Whalen (18) || Gardin (8) || Whalen (5) || KeyArena  6,588 || 14-14
|- align="center" bgcolor="ffbbbb"
| 29 || August 29 || 10:00pm || @ Phoenix || NBA TVWCTX || 84-95 || Jekabsone-Zogota (23) || Gardin (13) || Brown, Gardin, Whalen (3) || US Airways Center  9,977 || 14-15
|- align="center" bgcolor="ffbbbb"
| 30 || August 30 || 9:30pm || @ Los Angeles || NBA TVFSNW || 81-91 || Jekabsone-Zogota (21) || Gruda (7) || Whalen (9) || STAPLES Center  11,072 || 14-16
|-

|- align="center" bgcolor="ffbbbb"
| 31 || September 1 || 10:00pm || @ Sacramento ||  || 70-90 || Gruda, White (13) || Gruda (5) || Brown, Phillips (3) || ARCO Arena  6,015 || 14-17
|- align="center" bgcolor="bbffbb"
| 32 || September 4 || 7:00pm || New York || NBA TVMSG || 88-85 (OT) || Jekabsone-Zogota (23) || Jekabsone-Zogota (7) || Whalen (7) || Mohegan Sun Arena  6,685 || 15-17
|- align="center" bgcolor="ffbbbb"
| 33 || September 11 || 7:00pm || @ Atlanta  ||  || 64-88 || Gruda (16) || Gruda (6) || 4 players (2) || Philips Arena  8,644 || 15-18
|- align="center" bgcolor="bbffbb"
| 34 || September 13 || 3:00pm || Indiana || WCTX || 95-85 || Gardin (23) || Gardin (8) || Phillips (7) || Mohegan Sun Arena  9,047 || 16-18
|-

| All games are viewable on WNBA LiveAccess

Depth

Regular Season Statistics

Player Statistics

Team Statistics

Awards and honors
Asjha Jones was named WNBA Eastern Conference Player of the Week for the week of July 20, 2009.
Sandrine Gruda was named WNBA Eastern Conference Player of the Week for the week of August 17, 2009.
Asjha Jones was named to the 2009 WNBA All-Star Team as an Eastern Conference reserve.

Attendance
A sellout for a basketball game at Mohegan Sun Arena is 9,518.

References

External links

Connecticut Sun seasons
Connecticut
Connecticut Sun